Cottonwood Canyon is a canyon on the Skeena River in northwestern British Columbia, Canada.  It is located around the mouth of Sedan Creek, between the communities of Cedarvale and Kitwanga.

See also
Steamboats of the Skeena River
Kitselas Canyon

References

Canyons and gorges of British Columbia
Skeena Country